The 1990 Sunkist Fiesta Bowl was the 19th edition of the Fiesta Bowl, played on January 1, in Tempe, Arizona. The game featured the sixth-ranked Nebraska Cornhuskers of the Big Eight Conference and the independent fifth-ranked

Game summary
Less than four minutes into the game, Nebraska quarterback Gerry Gdowski threw a 9-yard touchdown pass to Morgan Gregory for the only score of the first quarter. Florida State got on the scoreboard with a 14-yard touchdown pass from quarterback Peter Tom Willis to wide receiver Terry Anthony, tying the game at seven early in the second quarter. Chris Drennan responded with a 39-yard field goal to put Nebraska ahead  with over twelve minutes left in the half.

Willis connected with wide receiver Reggie Johnson for a 5-yard touchdown pass and a 14–10 Seminole lead.

With six minutes left in the third quarter, Paul Moore scored for Florida State on a 1-yard touchdown run, but the extra point attempt was blocked and the score was  With 3:37 left in the quarter, Willis threw his fourth touchdown pass of the game, an 8-yard strike to Johnson, widening the gap  With two seconds left in the quarter, Willis threw a 24-yard touchdown pass to Terry Anthony for a   In the second and third quarters, Florida State outscored Nebraska  Nebraska scored the only points of the fourth quarter on a touchdown run by quarterback  with  It was the Huskers' worst defeat in a bowl game in 23 years.

Florida State climbed to third in the final AP poll, while Nebraska dropped to eleventh.

It was the fourth loss in as many appearances at the Fiesta Bowl for the  they won their next two in 1996 and 2000.

Scoring
First quarter
Nebraska – Morgan Gregory 9 pass from Gerry Gdowski (Gregg Barrios kick), 11:19

Second quarter
Florida State – Terry Anthony 14 pass from Peter Tom Willis (Richie Andrews kick), 13:42
Nebraska – Field goal, Chris Drennan 39, 12:15
Florida State – Reggie Johnson 5 pass from Willis (Andrews kick), 6:55
Florida State – Dexter Carter 10 pass from Willis (Andrews kick), 0:24

Third quarter
Florida State – Paul Moore 1 run (kick blocked), 5:59
Florida State – Johnson 8 pass from Willis (Andrews kick), 3:37
Florida State – Anthony 24 pass from Willis (Andrews kick), 0:02

Fourth quarter
Nebraska – Mickey Joseph 2 run (Drennan kick), 1:16

Statistics
{| class=wikitable style="text-align:center"
! Statistics   !!  Nebraska  !! FloridaState
|-
|align=left|First Downs || 18 || 18
|-
|align=left|Rushes–yards|| 46–115|| 24–72
|-
|align=left|Passing yards || 207 || 422
|-
|align=left|Passes || 15–26–2 || 25–41–0
|-
|align=left|Total yards || 322 || 494
|-
|align=left|Punts–average ||3–34|| 3–36
|-
|align=left|Fumbles–lost ||5–3|| 0–0
|-
|align=left|Turnovers by||5||0
|-
|align=left|Penalties-yards ||6–48|| 13–135
|-
|align=left|Time of possession ||32:30||27:30
|}

References

External links
http://huskerpedia.com/games/1989/12floridastate.html

Fiesta Bowl
Fiesta Bowl
Florida State Seminoles football bowl games
Nebraska Cornhuskers football bowl games
Fiesta Bowl
January 1990 sports events in the United States